Petryayevskaya is a rural locality (a village) in Bogorodskoye Rural Settlement, Ust-Kubinsky  District, Vologda Oblast, Russia. The population was 98 as of 2002. There are 2 streets.

Geography 
Petryayevskaya is located 71 km northwest of Ustye (the district's administrative centre) by road. Markovskaya is the nearest rural locality.

References 

Rural localities in Tarnogsky District